Kim Patrik Jansson (born 30 October 1981) is a former motorcycle speedway rider from Sweden.

Speedway career
Jansson rode in the top tier of British Speedway riding for the Ipswich Witches from 2002 to 2007, in the Elite League. 

In 16 August 2008, he crashed during a race in Sweden, while riding for Team Bikab against Filbyterna that left him paralysed.

References 

1981 births
Living people
Swedish speedway riders
Ipswich Witches riders
Sportspeople from Gothenburg